Agatha Christie's Marple is a British ITV television series based on the Miss Marple and other murder mystery novels by Agatha Christie. It is also known as Marple. The title character was played by Geraldine McEwan from the first to third series, until her retirement from the role.  She was replaced by Julia McKenzie from the fourth series onwards. The first six episodes were all adaptations of Miss Marple novels by Christie. Subsequent episodes were derived both from works featuring Miss Marple but also Christie novels that did not feature the character.

Series overview

Episodes

Series 1 (2004-05)

Series 2 (2006)

Series 3 (2007-09)
Series 3 was broadcast in Canada before the UK transmission, and in different episode orders.

Series 4 (2009-11)
The first and second episode episode of the fourth series were broadcast in Ireland before transmission in UK. The third and fourth episode were broadcast in Colombia and Hungary before transmission in UK.

Series 5 (2010-11)
This series was broadcast in the UK between the third and last episode of the fourth series. Note: In the episode "The Pale Horse" the guest star in the episode was: Holly Willoughby as Goody Carne.

Series 6 (2013)
First episode was broadcast in Hungary before transmission in UK and last in Argentina.

References

Agatha Christie
Miss Marple
Lists of British crime television series episodes